America's Most Wanted is a long-running TV show produced by 20th Century Fox.

"America's Most Wanted" may also refer to:

 America's Most Wanted (professional wrestling), a tag team that competed for Total Nonstop Action Wrestling
 America's Most Wanted (group), an American hip-hop group
 AmeriKKKa's Most Wanted, an album by American rapper Ice Cube
 "2 of Amerikaz Most Wanted", a song by American rappers 2pac and Snoop Dogg
 America's Most Wanted Tour, a 2009 concert tour
 America's 10 Most Wanted (video game), released in 2004 by Black Ops Entertainment
 Lists used by law enforcement agencies to alert the public, such as:
 FBI Ten Most Wanted Fugitives
 FBI Most Wanted Terrorists
 United States Secret Service Most Wanted Fugitives